Bank of Communications Limited (BoComm) (often abbreviated as ), is the fifth-largest bank in mainland China.

Established in 1908, the Bank of Communications claims a long history in China and is one of the banks to have issued banknotes in modern Chinese history. It was listed on the Stock Exchange of Hong Kong in June 2005  and the Shanghai Stock Exchange in May 2007. The Bank was ranked No.151 among Fortune Global 500 in terms of operating income by the Fortune and No.11 among the global top 1,000 banks in terms of Tier 1 Capital rated by the London-based magazine The Banker.

History

Before 1949 

In 1907, Liang Shiyi proposed the formation of a Bank of Communications to redeem the Beijing–Hankou Railway from its Belgian owners and place the railway under Chinese control.  The Bank of Communications was duly formed in 1908 and provided more than half of the financing needed to buy the railway.  The successful redemption enhanced the prestige of Liang's Communications Clique.

The bank's name uses the word "communications" to refer to the linking of two points by a means of transportation.

In order to expand the business into the overseas area, the Bank opened its first Hong Kong Branch on 27 November 1934.

After 1949

Republic of China

After the Chinese Civil War ended in 1949, the Bank of Communications, like the Bank of China, was effectively split into two operations, part of it relocating to Taiwan with the Kuomintang government. In Taiwan, the bank was also known as the Bank of Communications (Chiao Tung Bank). It eventually merged with the International Commercial Bank of China, the renamed Bank of China in Taiwan after its 1971 privatization, to become the Mega International Commercial Bank.

People's Republic of China
The mainland operation is the current Bank of Communications. Following the State Council's decision to restructure the Bank in 1986, the Bank was then restructured and re-commenced operations on 1 April 1987. Since then, its Head Office has been located at Shanghai.

Today

Today, the Bank of Communications is amongst the top 5 leading commercial banks in China and has an extensive network of over 2,800 branches covering over 80 major cities. Apart from Hong Kong, the Bank has also established overseas branches in New York, Tokyo, Singapore and representative offices in London and Frankfurt. As of end-2002, the Bank had over 88,000 employees and a total asset reaching RMB 5.15 trillion.

Bank of Communications currently possesses 236 domestic organs including 30 provincial branches, 7 directly managed branches, 199 sub-branches managed by the provincial branches with 3,529 network organs in over 239 large- and medium-sized cities. In addition, it has established 21 overseas organs including branch banks in Hong Kong, New York, San Francisco, Tokyo, Singapore, Seoul, Frankfurt, Macau, Sydney, and Ho Chi Minh City, BOCOMUK in London, and representative office in Taipei. According to the ranking announced by the British journal “The Banker” concerning 1,000 worldwide banks in 2011, Bank of Communications ranked 35th for its tier l capital, entering the world's top 50 banks for two consecutive years. Among the World's Top 500 Enterprises listed by Fortune in 2018, Bank of Communications ranked 168th., up by 3 as compared with 2017 and entering the World's Top 500 Enterprises for ten straight years. 
Bank of Communications is one of the major financial service suppliers in China with its business scope covering commercial banking, securities, trust, financial leasing, fund management, insurance, offshore financial services, etc.

Events in 2005
, 19.9% of the bank is owned by HSBC Holdings plc. An HSBC spokeswoman said HSBC and its affiliate, the Bank of Communications, would seek to acquire a brokerage to expand their operations in China. The plan was part of HSBC's broader China expansion strategy, but "there is nothing further to disclose at the present." HSBC's operations in China include its own banking operations, its stake in BoCom and an 8% stake in the Bank of Shanghai. HSBC also holds a 19.9% shares in Ping An Insurance through its wholly owned subsidiary HSBC Insurance Holdings. The South China Morning Post today cited Peter Wong Tung-shun, executive director at The Hongkong and Shanghai Banking Corporation, as saying that the acquisition is being considered in the light of the Chinese government's reforms of the country's securities brokerages. This includes a provision allowing foreign companies to get management control of brokerage firms. Wong did not provide a timetable for any acquisition or identify any acquisition target. The Hongkong and Shanghai Banking Corp is a wholly owned HSBC subsidiary.

Events in 2015
July 22, 2015 — Bank of Communications Co. sold $2.45 billion (about 14.93 billion yuan) of Basel III compliant bonds (convertible to preferred stock) “used to replenish the bank’s additional Tier 1 Capital.” The bond is registered on the Hong Kong stock exchange, and pays a coupon of 5 percent a year.

Shareholders

Note: H shares trustee: HKSCC Nominees Limited was excluded in the table

See also

Philippine Bank of Communications
Bank of Communications (Hong Kong)
Communications Clique
Banking in China

References

External links
 

 
Companies listed on the Shanghai Stock Exchange
Companies in the CSI 100 Index
Companies listed on the Hong Kong Stock Exchange
Banks of China
Banks based in Shanghai
Chinese brands
Companies in the Hang Seng Index
Government-owned companies of China
H shares
HSBC
Banks established in 1908
Chinese companies established in 1908
Re-established companies